Campiglossa argentata is a species of tephritid or fruit flies in the genus Campiglossa of the family Tephritidae.

Distribution
The species is found in Uganda, Kenya, Tanzania.

References

Tephritinae
Insects described in 1957
Diptera of Africa